Pinus bungeana (Japanese: シロマツ), also known by the common names Bunge's pine, lacebark pine and white-barked pine, is a pine tree native to northeastern and central China. Its smooth, grey-green bark gradually sheds in round scales to reveal patches of pale yellow, which turn olive-brown, red and purple on exposure to light.

Description 
The lacebark pine's trunk can grow either monopodial, as a single growth upwards, or sympodial, forked. Its crown is loosely shaped like a pyramid or umbrella. Each needles' cross-sections are shaped like a triangular semicircle.

Taxonomy 
P. bungeana is synonymous with the name Pinus excorticata, attributed to Lindley and Gordon in William Dallimore's Handbook of Coniferae and Ginkgoaceae. Its name is derived from the surname "Bunge", as one of its early identifications was by botanist Alexander von Bunge in 1831 near Beijing.

P. bungeana is closely related to Pinus gerardiana, another pine species with flaking bark, but P. bungeana has stiffer needles and smaller cones.

Distribution and habitat 
Pinus bungeana is native to temperate forests in the mountains of China, but it is also widely cultivated as an ornamental tree, especially for its metallic bark. It grows in the provinces of Shanxi, west Henan, south Gansu, south Hebei, north Sichuan, Shaanxi, west Shandong, and Hubei. In the northern portion of its range, it also occurs in acidic soil. As a light-demanding species, it usually grows in sites less suitable for other tree species.

It was introduced to England in 1843.

Ecology 
Pollination of the lacewood pine occurs in the months of April and May, while seeds mature in October and November of the second year.

Uses 
In China and Korea, the lacewood pine in traditionally planted near temples and cemeteries. It is also grown as an ornamental tree in classical gardens seeking to imitate Chinese gardens, in which it symbolizes longevity. It can also be seen in botanic gardens and often grows with multiple stems.

The wood of the lacebark pine is not commercially used as timber, but it is used locally by populations in northeast China for construction, furniture, and transport structures like pallets. The lacebark pine has edible seeds used in traditional Chinese medicine to provide relief for respiratory ailments.

Cultural significance
In 2009, P. bungeana was named the city tree of Baoji, China.

References

Further reading

External links

 Photo of cone
 Photo of foliage and male (pollen) cones
 Photo of bark

bungeana
bungeana
Edible nuts and seeds
Least concern plants